Pierre Houin (born 15 April 1994) is a French rower. He won the gold medal in the lightweight sculls at the 2015 European Championships, 2015 World Championships and 2016 Olympics.

Houin took up rowing aged 11 at l'Union Sportive de Toul following his brother, who won a national title in 2004. He has a tattoo on his chest saying "amat victoria curam" (victory loves carefulness).

References

External links

1994 births
Living people
People from Toul
French male rowers
World Rowing Championships medalists for France
Rowers at the 2016 Summer Olympics
Olympic rowers of France
Olympic gold medalists for France
Olympic medalists in rowing
Medalists at the 2016 Summer Olympics
Sportspeople from Meurthe-et-Moselle
21st-century French people